The 2022 Appalachian State Mountaineers football team represented Appalachian State University during the 2022 NCAA Division I FBS football season. The Mountaineers are led by third-year head coach Shawn Clark. Appalachian State plays their home games at Kidd Brewer Stadium on the school's Boone, North Carolina, campus, and compete as a member of the East Division of the Sun Belt Conference.

Previous season
The Mountaineers finished the 2021 season 10–4, 7–1 in Sun Belt play to finish in first place in the East division. As a result, they earned a trip to the Sun Belt Conference Championship Game where they lost to Louisiana. They received an invitation to the Boca Raton Bowl where they lost to Western Kentucky.

2022 NFL Draft

Preseason

Coaching changes
On February 9, 2022, offensive coordinator Frank Ponce was hired as the quarterbacks coach for the Miami Hurricanes. On February 21, Kevin Barbay was hired to be the Mountaineers' new offensive coordinator/quarterbacks coach. Barbay previously served in the same role for the Central Michigan Chippewas.

Media poll
The Sun Belt media days were held on July 25 and July 26. The Mountaineers were predicted to finish in first place in the Sun Belt's East Division. Appalachian State also received 10-of-14 first place votes.

Sun Belt Preseason All-Conference teams

Offense

1st team
Camerun Peoples – Running Back, RS-JR
Cooper Hodges – Offensive Lineman, RS-JR

2nd team
Chase Brice – Quarterback, RS-SR
Nate Noel – Running Back, SO
Damion Daley – Offensive Lineman, RS-JR

Defense

2nd team
Nick Hampton – Linebacker, RS-JR
Trey Cobb – Linebacker, SR
Steven Jones Jr. – Defensive Back, RS-SR

Personnel

Schedule
All conference games were announced March 1, 2022.

Staff

Game summaries

North Carolina

Statistics

at No. 6 Texas A&M

Statistics

This was Appalachian State's first win over an AP Top 10 team since a 34–32 victory over Michigan in 2007.

Troy

Statistics

College GameDay traveled to Boone, North Carolina for the first time.

The two teams went back and forth for most of the game, with the largest lead being only 7 points. The Trojans took a 28–24 lead early in the 4th quarter, a score that would stand for almost ten minutes. On their second-to-last offensive drive, the Mountaineers marched down to the Trojans' 2-yard line, but could not convert on 4th down and turned the ball over on downs. Troy could not pick up a 1st down and decided to go for it on 4th. On 4th down, Trojan quarterback Gunnar Watson intentionally ran out of his own end zone for a safety. On the kickoff, Ahmani Marshall returned the kick to the Mountaineers' 47-yard line with just 0:15 left to play. On the final play of the game, Chase Brice threw a Hail Mary pass that Troy's defense tried to knock down, but Christian Horn caught the deflected pass and ran it in for the game-winning touchdown.

James Madison

Statistics

The Citadel

{{Americanfootballbox
|titlestyle=;text-align:center;
|state=autocollapse
|title=The Citadel Bulldogs (1–2) at Appalachian State Mountaineers (2–2) – Game summary
|date=October 1
|time=3:30 p.m. EDT
|road=Bulldogs
|R1=0|R2=0|R3=0|R4=0
|home=Mountaineers
|H1=14|H2=21|H3=7|H4=7
|stadium=Kidd Brewer Stadium, Boone, North Carolina
|attendance=30,789
|weather=Rain, 
|referee=Javarro Edwards
|TV=ESPN+
|TVAnnouncers=David Jackson and Avery Hall
|reference=
|scoring=
First quarter
APP – Dashaun Davis 44 yard pass from Chase Brice (Michael Hughs kick), 12:18. Mountaineers 7–0. Drive: 6 plays, 74 yards, 2:37.
APP – Chase Brice 1 yard run (Michael Hughs kick), 2:38. Mountaineers 14–0. Drive: 8 plays, 75 yards, 3:54.
''Second quarterAPP – Eli Wilson 8 yard pass from Chase Brice (Michael Hughs kick), 11:55. Mountaineers 21–0. Drive: 8 plays, 65 yards, 3:35.
APP – Camerun Peoples 73 yard run (Michael Hughs kick), 9:31. Mountaineers 28–0. Drive: 1 play, 73 yards, 0:15.
APP – Christian Horn 22 yard pass from Chase Brice (Michael Hughs kick), 4:56. Mountaineers 35–0. Drive: 3 plays, 33 yards, 0:46.Third quarterAPP – Christian Horn 80 yard pass from Chase Brice (Michael Hughs kick), 3:23. Mountaineers 42–0. Drive: 1 play, 80 yards, 0:15.Fourth quarterAPP – Kanye Roberts 4 yard run (Michael Hughs kick), 6:40. Mountaineers 49–0. Drive: 7 plays, 60 yards, 3:20.
}}Statisticsat Texas StateStatisticsGeorgia StateStatisticsRobert MorrisStatisticsat Coastal CarolinaStatisticsat MarshallStatisticsOld DominionStatisticsat Georgia SouthernStatistics'''

References

Appalachian State
Appalachian State Mountaineers football seasons
Appalachian State Mountaineers football